Amara Condé (born 6 January 1997) is a German professional footballer who plays as a midfielder for 1. FC Magdeburg.

International career
Born in Germany to Guinean parents, Condé is a youth international for Germany having appeared at U15, U16, U18, U19, and U20 level.

References

External links
 
 
 

1997 births
Living people
Sportspeople from Freiberg
German people of Guinean descent
German footballers
Footballers from Saxony
Association football midfielders
Germany youth international footballers
VfL Wolfsburg players
VfL Wolfsburg II players
Holstein Kiel players
Rot-Weiss Essen players
1. FC Magdeburg players
2. Bundesliga players
3. Liga players
Regionalliga players